Heart Lake is an alpine lake in Camas County, Idaho, United States, located in the Soldier Mountains in the Sawtooth National Forest.  While no trails lead to the lake, the lake is north of Iron Mountain, which has an old Forest Service lookout on the top.

See also
 Sawtooth National Forest
 Soldier Mountains

References

External links
 Photo of Heart Lake

Lakes of Idaho
Lakes of Camas County, Idaho
Glacial lakes of the United States
Glacial lakes of the Sawtooth National Forest